The SRH University of Applied Sciences Heidelberg is a state-recognized private university in Heidelberg.

The university opened on October 1, 1969 as a "facility for the professional rehabilitation of people with disabilities in the tertiary education sector". In 1991, it was opened to private customers. Since then, the proportion of students with disabilities has dropped to around 5%.  In 2004 it was accredited by the Science Council. SRH University uses "Competence Oriented Research and Education" (The CORE principle) study model.

References

 
Technical universities and colleges in Germany
Universities of Applied Sciences in Germany
Private universities and colleges in Germany
Universities and colleges in Baden-Württemberg
1969 establishments in Germany
Educational institutions established in 1969
Education in Heidelberg
SRH Holding